Tuscan Wedding is a 2014 romantic comedy film directed by Johan Nijenhuis.

The film won the Golden Film award after having sold 100,000 tickets. The film also won the Platinum Film award after having sold 400,000 tickets.

The music was composed by Dutch violinist and conductor André Rieu.

Cast
Sophie van Oers as Sanne Klaartje van Straaten
Jan Kooijman as Jeroen Gerben Beukering
Simone Kleinsma as Marla van den Boomgaard
Ernst Daniël Smid as Tom Hendrik van Straaten
Diederik Ebbinge as Robert Frederik 'Bob' van Aspen
Lieke van Lexmond as Lisa Frederique Marianna Geertruida Leidekker
Dirk Zeelenberg as Koos Leidekker
Martine Sandifort as Bella
Carolien Spoor as Dominique Maria Leidekker
Ruud Feltkamp as Erik van Aspen
Matteo van der Grijn as Camillo
Alessandro Bressanello as Burgemeester Vittorio Bellamonti
Joy Wielkens as Lot
Medi Broekman as Marjolein

References

External links 
 

2014 films
Dutch romantic comedy films
2010s Dutch-language films
2010s English-language films
Films directed by Johan Nijenhuis
2014 multilingual films
2014 romantic comedy films
Dutch multilingual films